Hutton is a small village in the Scottish Borders region of Scotland. Historically part of Berwickshire, it is a traditional, country village surrounded by farmland.

Locality

Hutton lies one mile west of Paxton and two miles west of the border with Northumberland. Its closest market towns are Duns and Berwick-upon-Tweed.

The village

The village hall was recently redeveloped and is used for social events. Hutton Primary School was closed in June 2005 after numbers fell to 15 pupils, on the basis of cost. The village, however, thrives, with a local church, park and friendly traditional atmosphere.

Hutton Church

The Church at Hutton was dedicated by David de Bernham who was the Bishop of St Andrews on 6 April 1243. In 1652 seating was installed within the Parish Church, it is thought that it was the original church that had the seats installed. Before the seating was installed members of the congregation brought their own seats. Between the years of 1655 and 1660 Hutton Old Parish Church underwent repairs which included the addition of a gallery on the west side of the church and the roof being re-thatched.

In 1765 a new church was built to replace Hutton Old Parish Church. The new Church had seating for 400 people. The church had an earthen floor, un-plastered walls no ceiling and a thatched roof. A paved floor was laid in 1791 along with the plastering of the walls and ceiling. This church was demolished in 1834. At this time the church was said to be in a state of disrepair bordering on ruinous.

The present Church, built in 1835 by Ignatius Bonomi, is an impressive Romanesque Revival edifice inspired by Norham Church (where Bonomi also worked).

The bell bears the following inscription:

SOLI . DEO . GLORIA . IOHANNES . BURGERHUYS . ME . FECIT . 1661 .

Churchyard - rather overgrown and atmospheric, with mainly 18th- and 19th-century memorials.

Noteworthy:

 James Frisken, 1712, a full-length portrait surrounded by angels' heads and memento mori
 John Burn, 1733, a full-length portrait with open book
 Hutton Hall (castle) Burial Vault, north-west of the church, thought to be 17th-century

The former manse, Antrim House, sits north-west of the church (John Lessels 1876).

Constance, Lady Burrell financed the erection of a new parish church hall in 1931.

History

When the false warning of Napoleon's invasion in 1804 was sent out from the beacon station at Hume Castle, the volunteers from the district made Hutton their rallying-point, and spent a night under arms in the old church.

In more recent history it became popular with Polish soldiers after they were posted to nearby Winfield camp in World War II. After demobilization some continued to live in the village.

Traditional:

Hutton for old wives,

Broadmeadows for swine,

Paxton for drucken wives

And salmon sae fine.

Crossrig for lint and woo' 

Spittal for kale,

Sunwick for cakes and cheese

And lasses for sale.

Notable people

John Blair (1849-1934), Scottish landscape artist, was born there.
Andrew Forman (1465-1521), Archbishop of St Andrews.
Shipping magnate and philanthropist Sir William Burrell owned nearby Hutton Castle, and died there in 1958.
Dudley Marjoribanks, 1st Baron Tweedmouth  bought Hutton Hall estate in 1876.
The famous Wojtek (soldier bear) was stationed in Hutton during World War II.
Sir William and Constance, Lady Burrell attended the church.

See also

Hutton Castle
Paxton House
James Hutton

References
 Lost Houses of Scotland, by Marcus Biney, John Harris, & Emma Winnington, for SAVE Britain's Heritage, London, July 1980, 
 Borders and Berwick by Charles Alexander Strang,  The Rutland Press, 1994, 
 The Buildings of Scotland - Borders, by Kitty Cruft, John Dunbar and Richard Fawcett, Yale University Press, 2006, 
  The Scottish Nation - Or the Surnames, Families, Literature, Honours and Biographical History of The People of Scotland,
By William Anderson 1863
  The Border Counties - Tweeddale, Merse and Teviotdale, by Theo Lang 1957

Berwickshire
Villages in the Scottish Borders
Hutton Castle